Tout Puissant Mystère or simply TPMystère is an African football club based in Republic of the Congo.

The team plays in the Congo Second Division.

Performance in CAF competitions
 CAF Cup: 1 appearance
2000: First Round

References

External links

Football clubs in the Republic of the Congo